The S400 is a family of pressure fed liquid propelled rocket engines manufactured by ArianeGroup (former Airbus DS) at the Orbital Propulsion Centre in Lampoldshausen, Germany.

The chamber and throat are made of a platinum alloy, it uses double cone vortex injectors and uses both film and radiative cooling. The S400 engines are used as primary apogee engines for telecommunication satellite platforms such as the Spacebus of Thales Alenia Space as well as space exploration missions such as Venus Express, ExoMars Trace Gas Orbiter or Jupiter Icy Moons Explorer.

The S400 family has had an extensive history on the commercial telecommunication market. Its first launch was aboard the Symphonie 1 in 1974. This was the first commercial three-axis stabilized communications satellite in geostationary orbit with a bipropellant rocket propulsion system. It also was the first European communications satellite system. 
This family of engines have displayed a remarkable competitiveness, still winning many designs (for 2015, it is expected to fly on Sicral 2, ARSAT-2, Hispasat AG1 and MSG-4.

References 

Rocket engines using hypergolic propellant
Rocket engines using the pressure-fed cycle